Žerčice a municipality and village in Mladá Boleslav District in the Central Bohemian Region of the Czech Republic. It has about 400 inhabitants.

Geography
It lies on the border between the Jičín Uplands and Jizera Table. The Vlkava River flows through the municipality. There is a system of ponds in the southern part of the territory.

History
The first written mention of Žerčice is from 1070, in Chronica Boemorum. The greatest boom of Žerčice occurred during the rule of Hanuš Bryknár of Brukštejn in the early 16th century. The village was promoted to a market town in 1511. In 1621, Žerčice was purchased by the Waldstein family and joined to the Dobrovice estate. In 1639, during the Thirty Years' War, Žerčice was burned down by the Swedish army and ceased to be a market town.

Sights
The main landmark of Žerčice is the Church of Saint Nicholas. It was built in the Baroque style in 1730 according to the design of the architect František Maxmilián Kaňka. It replaced an old church, first mentioned in 1384.

Next to the primary school is a statue of Saint Florian from 1770.

Notable people
Samuel Capricornus (1628–1665), composer

References

External links

Villages in Mladá Boleslav District